Boyd  may refer to:

Places

Canada
 Boyd Conservation Area, a conservation area located northwest of Toronto, Ontario
  Boyd Lake (disambiguation)

United States
 Boyd County (disambiguation)
 Boyd, Indiana
 Boyd, Iowa
 Boyd, Kansas
 Boyd, Kentucky
 Boyd, Minnesota
 Boyd, Missouri
 Boyd, Texas
 Boyd, Wisconsin

Elsewhere
 Boyd Cave, Oregon
 Boyd Escarpment, in Antarctica
 Boyd Island, Antarctica
 Boyd River (disambiguation), several rivers in Australia
River Boyd, in the UK

People
 Boyd (given name), a list of people with the given name
 Boyd (surname), the surname, and a list of people with the surname
 Boyd baronets, two baronetcies 
 Boyd Family, an Australian family
 Boyd Gang, a criminal gang
 Clan Boyd, a Scottish clan

Brands and enterprises
Boyd, an archaic Bordeaux wine producing estate since divided into:
 Château Boyd-Cantenac
 Château Cantenac-Brown
 Boyd, an American manufacturer of environmental seals and energy management products
 Boyd Gaming Corporation, a casino operator

Education
 Boyd High School (disambiguation)
 Boyd Independent School District, Boyd, Texas

Fictional characters
 Boyd, a Fighter in the game Fire Emblem: Path of Radiance
Drew Boyd, from the television series Queer as Folk
Jonah Boyd, the eponymous character in David Leavitt's novel The Body of Jonah Boyd
Mr. Boyd, character in Barney & Friends
Woody Boyd, from the television series Cheers
Boyd Cooper, in the game Psychonauts
Boyd Crowder, from the television series, Justified
Boyd Fowler, from the television series, Dexter
Boyd Hoyland, from the television series Neighbours
Boyd Langton, from the television series Dollhouse
B.O.Y.D., from the television series DuckTales

Other uses

 OODA Loop, a theory of decision making also known as the Boyd Cycle

See also
Boyd House (disambiguation)
Boyds (disambiguation)
 Boyd Q.C., English television series
 Boyd massacre, one of the worst recorded instances of mass cannibalism, in which up to 66 people were killed and eaten on the northern coast of New Zealand
 Boyd v. United States, United States Supreme Court case about search and seizure
Justice Boyd (disambiguation)